Héctor Ignacio Rodríguez Peña  (born 22 October 1968 in Montevideo) is a Uruguayan football manager and former player who played as a central defender. He is the current manager of Defensor Sporting.

Club career
Rodríguez Peña played for Deportivo Mandiyú and Colón in the Primera División de Argentina.

International career
Rodríguez Peña made ten appearances for the senior Uruguay national football team from 1991 to 1997, including four 1998 FIFA World Cup qualifying matches. He played for Uruguay at the Copa América 1993.

References

External links

1968 births
Living people
Uruguayan footballers
Uruguayan expatriate footballers
Uruguay international footballers
Footballers from Montevideo
1991 Copa América players
1993 Copa América players
1997 Copa América players
C.A. Bella Vista players
Defensor Sporting players
Club Nacional de Football players
Racing Club de Montevideo players
Club Atlético Colón footballers
Deportivo Mandiyú footballers
América de Cali footballers
Everton de Viña del Mar footballers
Uruguayan Primera División players
Primera B de Chile players
Chilean Primera División players
Argentine Primera División players
Categoría Primera A players
Expatriate footballers in Argentina
Expatriate footballers in Chile
Expatriate footballers in Colombia
Association football defenders
Uruguayan football managers
Defensor Sporting managers